Nattal Sahu (नट्टल साहु) of Yoginipur (now Mehrauli, Delhi) is the earliest known Agrawal Jain merchant-prince, who lived during the reign Tomara king, Anangapal. His life's account is described in Apabhramsha text Pasanaha Cariu (Parshvanath Caritra) of poet Vibudh Shridhar, written in Vikrama Samvat 1189 (1132 CE).

Nattal's father was Sahu Joja. He had two older brothers Raghav and Sodhal.

Nattal was the chief of the Jains of Delhi. He controlled a commercial empire spread through Anga, Vanga (Bengal), Kalinga (Odisha), Karnataka, Nepal, Bhot (Tibet), Panchal, Chedi, Gauda, Thakka (Punjab), Kerala, Marahatta (Maharashtra), Bhadanaka (Bayana), Magadh, Gurjar, Sorath (Saurashtra) and Haryana. He was also a minister in the court of Tomar Anangapala.

Poet Vibudh Shridhar, who was also an Agrawal Jain, had migrated from Haryana to Delhi. Nattala, as a patron, urged him to write the Pasanaha Cariu. Shridhara finished the composition in Vikrama Samvat 1189 (1132 CE), and thus became the first known Jain author. He describes his patron thus:

सिरि अयरवाल कुल कमल मित्तु, 
सुधम्म कम्म पवियण्य-वित्तु

siri ayaravaala kula kamala mittu,

sudhamma kamma paviyaNya-vittu

Nattala Sahu had built a beautiful temple of Lord Adinath. He had the idol installed with an elaborate ceremony:

जैनं चैत्यमकारि सुन्दरतरं जैनीं प्रतिष्ठां तथा|
स श्रीमान्विदितः सदैव जयतात्पृथ्वीतले नट्टलः||

jainaM chaityamakaari sundarataraM jainii.n pratishhThaa.n tathaa|
sa shreemaanviditaH sadaiv jayataatpR^ithviitale naTTalaH||

It is believed that fragments of this temple were used for the Quwwat-al-Islam mosque near Qutab Minar.

See also
 Agrawal Jain
 Apabhramsha
 Jainism
 Qutub complex

References

Indian merchants
Hindi-language literature
Businesspeople from Delhi
Mehrauli
Year of birth unknown
Year of death unknown
12th-century Indian Jains